The Society of Petroleum Engineers has a petroleum engineering certification program whereby it certifies the technical knowledge of petroleum engineers. The certification is granted based on an examination in conjunction with experience of the applicant. Once certified individuals must renew their certification annually to keep it current. A list of current SPE-certified petroleum engineers is available online.

SPE has an online SPE Certification and PE Exam Review available to SPE members and non-members alike. An exam guide is also available to prepare for the exam. The course is taught by two university professors and offers 1.6 CEUs.

Certification and professional competency

Part of SPE's mission is to assist members in furthering their technical and professional competence. Defining required knowledge for different areas of engineering, and offering an opportunity to demonstrate technical knowledge through examination are two of the ways that SPE accomplishes this.  A SPE-certified petroleum professional is competent to provide reserves for oil and gas in accordance with the guidelines promulgated by the Society of Petroleum Engineers.

Petroleum professional certification
While the United States, United Kingdom and some other countries have professional engineer registration programs, many other countries do not. The Society of Petroleum Engineers developed a certification program for petroleum engineers to demonstrate their technical knowledge, the SPE certification program, which requires a thorough knowledge of the principles of petroleum engineering.

The requirements to receive the SPE certification, as listed on the SPE website in April 2013:
 Undergraduate degree in petroleum engineering or related science
 Passing score on the SPE exam to measure level of engineering fundamentals and ability to solve practical engineering problems.
 Demonstration of at least four years of practical engineering experience and training in the industry
 Professional membership in good standing with the Society of Petroleum Engineers

Maintenance of the certification requires completing 16 hours of continued professional development and education, in addition to paying an annual renewal fee (US$40).

Waivers 
The exam may be waived for those who pass a written competency examination to practice petroleum engineering as a registered, licensed, or professional engineer. Exams administered by Indonesia (IATMI), Alberta, Canada, and all United States are acceptable. University exit exams are not considered valid for this waiver.

Professional competency matrices
Beyond basic engineering skills, many disciplines require specialized expertise gained through training and experience. SPE has identified the skills associated with various levels of competency in five primary areas of engineering.

Guide to professional conduct
SPE's board has set forth the expectations for professional and ethical behavior by petroleum professionals.

See also 
 Petroleum industry

References 

Petroleum engineering
Qualifications
Training

it:Society of Petroleum Engineers
ru:Общество инженеров-нефтяников